The Madison City Channel is a Government-access television (GATV) cable television station operated by the City of Madison, Wisconsin.  The channel airs live and archived meetings and events involving the governments of the City of Madison and Dane County; reports and announcements from and profiles of government officials and representatives; and programs on current events, issues, and services that affect the city and area.

The channel originally aired on Channel 12 of Charter Communications Madison cable system (where it was commonly known by City Channel 12 or CitiCable 12).  On September 30, 2008, the channel moved to Channel 98 on Charter's basic analog tier and Channel 994 on the digital tier.  An aborted relocation plan in August 2008 would have seen the channel move to the digital-only tier, a move allowed by a provision in the Video Competition Act that was passed by Wisconsin's legislature in 2007; the move faced objections from the member stations of the Wisconsin Association of Public, educational, and government access (PEG) channels.

See also
Public-access television

External links
The website for the Madison City Channel

American public access television
Television channels and stations established in 2008